Okonek  is a town in Poland, in Greater Poland Voivodeship, with approximately 4,200 inhabitants. Town and commune in Złotów County. Chartered as a town in 1754.

Cities and towns in Greater Poland Voivodeship
Złotów County